The 2014–15 Auburn Tigers women's basketball team will represent Auburn University during the 2014–15 NCAA Division I women's basketball season. The Tigers, led by third year head coach Terri Williams-Flournoy, play their home games at Auburn Arena and were a members of the Southeastern Conference. They finished the season 12–17, 3–13 in SEC play to finish in thirteenth place. They advanced to the second round of the SEC women's tournament which they lost Texas A&M.

Roster

Schedule

|-
!colspan=9 style="background:#172240; color:#FE3300;"| Non-conference regular season

|-
!colspan=9 style="background:#172240; color:#FE3300;"| SEC regular season

|-
!colspan=9 style="background:#172240; color:#FE3300;" | SEC Women's Tournament

Source

See also
 2014–15 Auburn Tigers men's basketball team

References

Auburn Tigers women's basketball seasons
Auburn
Auburn Tigers women's basketball
Auburn Tigers women's basketball